Dimitrie Bolintineanu (14 January 1819 (1825 according to some sources), Bolintin-Vale – 20 August 1872, Bucharest) was a Romanian poet, though he wrote in many other styles as well, diplomat, politician, and a participant in the revolution of 1848. He was of Aromanian origins. His poems of nationalist overtone fueled emotions during the unification of Wallachia and Moldavia.

Biography
Dimitrie Bolintineanu was of Aromanians origin, his father, Ienache Cosmad, came from Ohrid. In a few years his father, Ienache, made a successful carrier in Wallachia, first he was a tenant, small owner, then sub-prefect, with the residence in Bolintin-Vale, village near Bucharest; he does not manage to leave to his second-born son, Dimitrie, some property for relieve.

He remained orphan of both parents since 1831, and was raised by the relatives. He started to earn for leaving since yearly youth, such as Grigore Alexandrescu, Ion Luca Caragiale, Mihai Eminescu, being a civil servants. In 1841, he was a clerk at the State Secretariat, in 1843 a secretary at the department of "Suddito Reasons". In 1844, It is a riddle, wrapped in a mystery, how he was raised to the rank of a Pitar (boyar who bossing the bakeries). In 1842t he published an admirable poem "A young girl on the bed of death", that was eulogistically presented by Ion Heliade Rădulescu (and later recited by Mihai Eminescu in Epigones), who probably played a decisive role. The poem "A young girl on the bed of death" was an imitation after "La jeune captive” ("The Young Prisoner"), by André Chénier, and was published in "Courier of Ambe Sexes".

Participant in the 1848 revolution 
The revolution of 1848 has brought a newspapers explosion. If C.A. Rosetti had issued, immediately after the shot, "The Romanian child", Bolintineanu leads (from 19 July to 11 September) "The Sovereign People". It was a small, four-page sheet with only two columns on each side, but the chief editor had big projects. He wanted to print a "journal of democratic interests and social progress", according to the French model - Le Peuple souverain.

After the revolution of 1848, he came back in the country and edited together with Nicolae Bălcescu, Cezar Bolliac and others  "The sovereign people", but – when the revolution dropped - was exiled and went to Transylvania, then to Constantinople and finally to Paris to continue his interrupted studies.

Exile  
In 1855, Mr. Grigore Ghica offered him a chair of Romanian literature in Iasi, but the Porte did not allow him to enter the country, and then he traveled through Palestine, Egypt, Syria, and Macedonia, describing them all in various publications, which often include interesting and warmly written pages.

In 1859, returning to the country, he entered into the politics and became Minister of Foreign Affairs, Cults and Public Instruction. Thanks to his efforts and of Costache Negri and V. A. Urechia, the first schools were set up for Macedonian Romanians. In the same year, in 1859, he received the third degree in the Steaua Danube Lodge of Bucharest, and in 1864, he was a member of the Brotherhood Lodge.

Illness and death 
In the first half of 1870, Dimitrie Bolintineanu traveled to Paris. Some of his historical biographies were reedited. Prints the collection of satire  of Menadele and the volume of poems Romania's Complaints. He collaborates, by April, with the Romanian of C. A. Rosetti. Being seriously ill, he was forced to quit his work. In 1871, Bolintineanu's disease worsened. The poet was poor. The pension he received went into the pockets of creditors. The officials refused to give him any help. In April, a lottery with personal Bolintineanu’s stuff was organized, at the initiative of George Sion. On 28 April, at the National Theater in Bucharest a performance took place, for the benefit of the former member of the theater committee. On 25 June, a group of MP’s (including Cezar Bolliac) proposes to the Chamber to vote on a national reward "for our good poet Dimitrie Bolintineanu, who is deprived of the existence of all days". Sent for the approval and acceptance in the division,  the proposal was buried in files. Bolintineanu has got a mental illness from misery and poverty.

The poet was admitted to Pantelimon Hospital. In the patients’ register book was written: «Dimitrie Bolintineanu, former Minister of Cults, entered without clothes». In 1872, the lottery that was initiated in 1871 by George Sion took place in March. Bolintineanu's books were won by V. Alecsandri, the bookcase of the library - by C. Negri, and the other furniture - by Catinca Balș. Alecsandri and Negri asked that the objects that belonged to remain to Bolintineanu'. On the August the 20th , in the morning, he died in the hospital. He was buried at the Bolintinul din Vale.

The poetic work 
Dimitrie Bolintineanu has written extensively both prose and lyrics. His poetic work includes the cycles of the Historical Legends, the Bosphorus Flowers, the Fairy Tales, the Macedonians and the Reverions.

References

External links

 Pașoptistul pelerin, 12 February 2007, Daniela Cârlea Șontică, Jurnalul Național 
 CTITORI AI ROMÂNIEI/150 de ani de la Unirea Principatelor Române, 12 January 2009, Jurnalul Național 
 Dimitrie Bolintineanu, propovăduitorul libertății române , Adrian AGACHI, 1 August 2009, Ziarul Lumina 
 Scriitor și revoluționar pașoptist, fost ministru în timpul domniei lui Cuza, a murit sărac lipit pământului, 1 November 2013, Bogdan Vladu, Adevărul 

1819 births
1872 deaths
People from Bolintin-Vale
19th-century Romanian poets
Romanian male poets
Romanian people of Aromanian descent
Romanian Ministers of Culture
Romanian Ministers of Education
19th-century male writers